Bagna càuda (meaning "hot dip", "hot gravy") is a hot dish made from garlic and anchovies, originating in Piedmont, Italy, during the 16th century. The dish is served and consumed in a manner similar to fondue, sometimes as an appetizer, with raw or cooked vegetables typically used to dip into it.

Overview
Bagna càuda is a hot dish and dipping sauce in Italian cuisine that is used to dip vegetables in. It is prepared using olive oil, chopped anchovies and garlic. Additional ingredients sometimes used include truffle and salt. Raw or cooked vegetables are dipped into the sauce, which is typically kept hot on a serving table using a heat source such as a candle or burner.

Bagna càuda originates from and has been described as "unique to" Piedmont, a Northwest Italy region, and has been a part of Piedmontese cuisine since the 16th century. In Piedmont, cardoon (edible thistle) is often dipped in the sauce. Additional foods used to dip into it include cabbage, celery, carrots, Jerusalem artichoke, peppers, fennel and breads. It is sometimes served as an appetizer.

It is also a popular winter dish in central Argentina and prevalent in Clinton, Indiana, Rock Springs, Wyoming, and Benld, Illinois, United States, as there were many northern Italian immigrants to those places. Bagna càuda was also prepared in the coal-mining community of Madison County, Illinois  (including Collinsville, Edwardsville, and Maryville, Illinois), due to the numerous Italian immigrants that came there to work in the mines.

History
In the past walnut or hazelnut oil would have been used. Sometimes, truffles are used in versions around Alba, Piedmont, Italy. It is traditionally eaten during the autumn and winter months, particularly at Christmas and New Year's, and must be served hot, as the name suggests.

Similar dishes
Pinzimonio is a similar dipping sauce prepared using olive oil, wine vinegar, salt and pepper that is served with raw vegetables. It is typically served cold.

See also

 List of Italian dishes
 List of dips
 List of garlic dishes
 List of hors d'oeuvre

References

External links
 
 

Cuisine of Piedmont
Italian cuisine
Dips (food)
Anchovy dishes
Fish sauces
Garlic dishes